Peter Mundy (fl. 1597 – 1667) was a seventeenth-century British factor, merchant trader, traveller and writer. He was the first Briton to record, in his Itinerarium Mundi ('Itinerary of the World'), tasting Chaa (tea) in China and travelled extensively in Asia, Russia and Europe.

Life
Mundy came from Penryn in south Cornwall. In 1609 he accompanied his father, a pilchard trader  to Rouen across the Channel in Normandy, and was then sent to Gascony to learn French. In May 1611 he went as a cabin-boy in a merchant ship, and gradually rose in life until he became of independent circumstances.

He visited Constantinople in 1617, returning to London  and overland via Bulgaria, Sarajevo, Split, Venice, Chambéry and Paris with the English Ambassador Paul Pindar, and afterwards made a journey to Spain as a clerk in the employ of Richard Wyche. Following Wyche's death and a brief spell in the family Pilchard business, he returned to London and obtained employment on account of his language skills, travelling experience and reference from Pindar, with the East India Company on a salary of 25 pounds.

As a fisherman and sailor it is likely that he spoke at least some Cornish of which he makes some account of its relation to Welsh, visiting Wales (and climbing Ysgyryd Fawr) in 1639 where he noted "few of the common or poorer sort understand any English at all".

He went on further voyages to India, China, and Japan, when he started from the Downs on 14 April 1636. His journals record his being served "Chaa" or tea by the Chinese and tasting chocolate aboard a Spanish merchant vessel. The fleet of four ships and two pinnaces were sent out by Sir William Courten, and Mundy seems to have been employed as a factor. His journals end somewhat abruptly, but a manuscript in the Rawlinson collection at the Bodleian Library continues the narrative of his life, spending many years living in the Hansa free city of Danzig  - modern Gdańsk - including journeys to Denmark, Prussia, and Russia, which lasted from 1639 to 1648. Mundy himself made the drawings for the volume and traced his routes in red on the maps of Hondius. In 1663 he declared his travelling days over and retired to Falmouth. His journals record his own calculation of the distance he had travelled in his many voyages as 100,833 and 5/8th miles. His manuscripts were lost for nearly 300 years before being published by the Hakluyt Society.

Philip Marsden's history of Falmouth, The Levelling Sea, published in 2011, provides a brief account of Peter Mundy's life on pages 131–137.

He also left the earliest description of the Musaeum Tradescantianum.

Travels to India 
Peter Mundy travelled from England to Surat which he reached at September 1628. At 1630 it was agreed to transfer Peter Mundy to Agra. He began his journey at November 11 and reached Agra at 3rd January 1631. He served his superiors but then he was told to go to Patna to make an investment on cloth. On 6th August 1632 he set out to Patna. He traveled 500 miles and then reached Patna at 20th September 1632. He had not made a nice profit in Patna. He decided to return Agra on 16th November 1632. He reached Agra at 22nd December and stayed there for two months, where he witnessed the marriage of Shah Jahan's 2 elder sons. He liked visiting Fatehpur Sikri which was deserted by Akbar.

Character
"It is rare to find a man so representative of his period as was Peter Mundy. In an age when curiosity was the outstanding characteristic of intelligent Englishmen, curiosity was the ruling passion of this life. ... His insatiable appetite for information, his eye for detail, his desire for accuracy, would have made him in modern times a first-rate scientist. ... True to his period, also, was his heartlessness ... he was more interested in the appearances of things than their implications in the lives of human beings. ... But if he was unfeeling, he was by no means insensitive; each strange item in the surprising world he had inherited is described with a spontaneous brilliance seldom to be found in modern writing."

Itinerary
1530s Grandfather was Chanoor or Chantor at Glasney College )
1596 Born at Penryn, his father was Richard Mundy
Religious education with uncle in Devon
1608 first voyage to Rouen with his Father trading pilchards
1610 Bayonne, Gascony to learn 'the French Tongue'
1611 No further mention of his mother
1613 San Lucar with Mr Parker
1615 Seville with Mr Weaver, “attains” the Spanish Tongue
1617 Constantinople with James Wyche; returns overland via Belgrade; Sarajevo; Split; Venice; Padua; Verona; Milan; crosses the Alps to Lyons; Orleans; Paris; Calais; London
1620-21 Returns overland to Penryn
1621 Seville for ‘the Copper Contract’; apparently a Falmouth-based family venture with sparse details recorded initially.
1625 Valladolid
1626 St Malo and Jersey – apparently an excursion for pleasure
1628 Applies to the East India Company to Surat, India on £25 salary
1635-38 India to Japan 
1639 ‘Petty Progress’ in England & Wales
1640-1647 Amsterdam and Holland, Prussia, Warsaw and Poland, Russia – based from the  free city of Dantzigk / Gdansk
1647 Returns to Falmouth
1650-54 Begins writing in earnest in London
1655-56 3rd Voyage to India on the Alleppo Merchant
1658 Stays in London
1663-67 Returns to complete memoires in Penryn.

Notes

References

1590s births
1677 deaths
17th-century English writers
17th-century English male writers
Explorers from Cornwall
Writers from Cornwall
English male writers
British East India Company people
People from Penryn, Cornwall
17th-century travelers